Ceropsora is a genus of rust fungus in the family Coleosporiaceae. The genus is monotypic, containing the single species Ceropsora piceae, found growing on spruce in India.

References

External links
 

Pucciniales
Fungi of Asia
Taxa described in 1960
Monotypic Basidiomycota genera